Glipa satoi is a species of beetle in the genus Glipa. It was described in 1950.

References

satoi
Beetles described in 1950